The Epochs are an alternative rock band based in Brooklyn, New York, and fronted by the brothers Hays and Ryan Holladay.

Members
Hays and Ryan Holladay grew up in Arlington, Virginia, and are self-taught musicians.  The brothers share vocal duties on the group's two albums and in their live performances.  In concert, the brothers both play guitar, keyboards, and other percussion instruments.

The band's drummer, who goes by the name of "Kotchy", is a native of Indianapolis, Indiana.  According to his website , Kotchy also works as an independent "creator of video, electronic and acoustic music."

The band's bassist is Kevin Smith, who is no relation to the filmmaker of the same name.

History

The band was originally a twosome, composed of the Holladay brothers, who essentially self-produced the Epochs first album, Ten Billion Light Years of Solitude in 2000/2001.  After moving to New York to attend college, they added a rhythm section of Kotchy and Aaron Reed and began the slow process of writing and rehearsing the songs that would become their eponymous album.

The band nexus of operations for the period of 2002-2003 and again from 2006 to today is Sunset Park, Brooklyn.  They live and rehearse in a large loft space above a battery wholesaler and within close proximity of both a church and a liquor store.

Albums and EPs

Sources

Band Bio from the Mercury Lounge 

The Epochs at Myspace.com 

"Brooklyn Based Band Might Be to Rock Critics What Jessica Biel is to Teenaged Boys" at Boston.com 

2002 establishments in New York City
Indie rock musical groups from New York (state)
Musical groups from Brooklyn
Musical groups established in 2002